Aquatarium may refer to:

Aquatarium (Ontario) -- an interactive science museum in Brockville, Ontario, Canada
Aquatarium (Florida) -- a former amusement park in St. Pete Beach, Florida, USA

See also
Aquatorium